"Gimcrack & Bunkum" is the fifth episode of the second season of the HBO television series Boardwalk Empire, and 17th episode overall.  Originally aired on October 23, 2011, it was written by co-executive producer Howard Korder and directed by executive producer Tim Van Patten.

Plot 
Nucky makes a speech for a Memorial Day observance.  He surprises Jimmy by inviting him to speak on stage, apparently to embarrass him, but Jimmy does an acceptable job.

Nucky courts the assistance of U.S. Attorney General Harry Daugherty in his election fraud case. He meets Thorogood, the DA for his case.  Thorogood, Daugherty and Smith outline a scheme in which the case against Nucky will be dropped. Nucky wants a guarantee, but is not given one.

Richard Harrow flicks through his scrapbook before taking a trip into the woods. He prepares to commit suicide, but is interrupted by a stray dog. After meeting and talking with two hunters, Richard returns to Atlantic City.

Insulted by Parkhurst, one of his wealthy backers, Jimmy is advised by Gillian to make an example of him. Jimmy and Richard scalp Parkhurst.

With cold feet after the Commodore's stroke, Eli attempts to rejoin Nucky by informing him of the Commodore's situation. Nucky calls Eli a backstabber and refuses the apology. O'Neill confronts Eli with the rumour of the stroke. Eli tries ineffectually to lie, and ends up killing a flustered O'Neill who says he wants out of the deal. Eli digs a hole and dumps O'Neill's body into it.

Title 
Gimcrack is defined as "something showy but worthless". Bunkum is defined as "speechmaking designed for show or public applause."

Reception

Critical reception 
IGN gave the episode a score of 9 out of 10, saying that "Boardwalk'''s best when it balances its jolts of violence with contemplative moments for its very complicated characters. "Gimcrack & Bunkum" is Boardwalk at its best."

 Ratings 
The episode was watched by 2.691 million viewers, and rose one tenth to a 1.1 adults 18-49 rating.

 References 

 External links 
 
  "Gimcrack & Bunkum" at HBO.com
 "Gimcrack & Bunkum" review by Noel Murray (23 October 2011) for The A.V. Club "Gimcrack & Bunkum" review by Teresa Lopez (24 October 2011) for TV Fanatic
 Review: Boardwalk Empire—"Gimcrack & Bunkum": A walk in the woods by Alan Sepinwall (23 October 2011) for HitFix
 "Gimcrack & Bunkum" review by Sean Gandert (24 October 2011) for Paste''
 "Gimcrack & Bunkum" review by Joe R for Television Without Pity

2011 American television episodes
Boardwalk Empire episodes
Television episodes directed by Tim Van Patten